Firbank Fell is a hill in Cumbria between the towns of Kendal and Sedbergh that is renowned as a place where George Fox, the founder of the Religious Society of Friends (Quakers), preached.

Fox described what happened there on 13 June 1652 in this way:

While others were gone to dinner, I went to a brook, got a little water, and then came and sat down on the top of a rock hard by the chapel. In the afternoon the people gathered about me, with several of their preachers. It was judged there were above a thousand people; to whom I declared God's everlasting truth and Word of life freely and largely for about the space of three hours.

Because of Fox's preaching there, the site is sometimes called "Fox's Pulpit."  A plaque on the rock there commemorates the event, which is sometimes considered the beginning of the Friends movement.

Firbank Fell is now immortalised as a place of Quaker history in one of the four houses at the Quaker school Bootham School.

External links 
Pictures and Selection from Fox's Journal from Quaker Info
Pictures of the Plaque at Visit Cumbria Website

Quakerism in the United Kingdom
Mountains and hills of Cumbria
Quakerism in England